The 2009 Indian general election polls in Kerala were held for 20 seats in the state.

Alliances 
United Democratic Front (UDF) is a Kerala legislative alliance and is allied to United Progressive Alliance (UPA) in the Lok Sabha. LDF comprises primarily of CPI(M) and the CPI, forming the Left Front in the national level. National Democratic Alliance (NDA), led by Bharatiya Janata Party (BJP) contested in all 20 seats.

United Democratic Front

Left Democratic Front

National Democratic Alliance

List of Elected MPs

Constituency-Wise Detailed Results

Performance of Political Parties

Performance by alliance

References

Indian general elections in Kerala
Kerala